Preben Lundbye (born 1 April 1950) is a Danish football coach previously for Holstebro Boldklub and Silkeborg IF. As a football player for Hvidovre IF he won the Danish Championship back in 1973. He ended his career in 1975 due to an injury.

He has a degree in pedagogy and psychology.

References 

1950 births
Living people
Danish men's footballers
Danish football managers
Hvidovre IF players
Silkeborg IF managers
Association football defenders
Kjellerup IF managers